Jazzgroove Mothership Orchestra is an Australian large jazz ensemble. Together with Kristin Berardi they were nominated for the 2011 ARIA Award for Best Jazz Album with Kristin Berardi Meets The Jazzgroove Mothership Orchestra. The ensemble consists of yl Pratt (vibraphone), Brendan Clarke (contrabass), Tom Botting (contrabass), Jamie Cameron (drums, cymbals), Evan Mannell (drums), and Phil South (percussion).

Discography

Albums

Awards and nominations

ARIA Music Awards
The ARIA Music Awards is an annual awards ceremony that recognises excellence, innovation, and achievement across all genres of Australian music.

|-
| 2011
| Kristin Berardi Meets the Jazzgroove Mothership Orchestra
| ARIA Award for Best Jazz Album
| 
|-

See also

 Australian jazz

References

External links
 Jazzgroove Mothership Orchestra at AllMusic

Australian jazz ensembles
2003 establishments in Australia
Musical groups established in 2003